Svn Fngrs is a mini-album by Black Francis (a.k.a. Frank Black), released on March 3, 2008 by Cooking Vinyl. The album's title is a reference to the Irish mythological hero Cúchulainn, who was said to have seven fingers and seven toes. The songs "Seven Fingers" and "When They Come to Murder Me" also feature lyrics written from Cúchulainn's point of view.

Track listing

Personnel
Credits adapted from the album's liner notes.
 Black Francis – vocals, guitar, harmonica
 Jason Carter – drums, percussion, producer, engineer, mixing, mastering
 Violet Clark – bass
 Thaddeus Moore – engineer
 Julian Harkema – artwork, design
 Mark Lemhouse – artwork, design

References

Black Francis albums
2008 debut EPs
Cooking Vinyl EPs